Lenore Muraoka Rittenhouse (born December 12, 1955) is an American professional golfer who played on the LPGA Tour. She played under her maiden name, Lenore Muraoka, until her marriage in 1987, and then under her married name, Lenore Rittenhouse.

Muraoka won once on the LPGA Tour in 1983.

Muraoka Rittenhouse was inducted into the Hawaii Sports Hall of Fame in 2010.

Professional wins

LPGA Tour wins (1)

LPGA Tour playoff record (0–1)

References

American female golfers
LPGA Tour golfers
Golfers from Honolulu
University of Hawaiʻi alumni
American sportspeople of Japanese descent
1955 births
Living people
21st-century American women